Bayly's Cove was on Bonavista Bay and had a population of 900 in 1911.

See also
 List of ghost towns in Newfoundland and Labrador

Ghost towns in Newfoundland and Labrador